Nanjing No. 3 High School (also known as ) is a high school in central Nanjing, China. It was founded in 1902. The school is housed on Li Xiucheng's house. The educator and reformer Tao Xingzhi served as the school's principal for seven years and made "truth" the school's motto.

References

External links
 Official website

High schools in Nanjing
Educational institutions established in 1902
1902 establishments in China